Aliabad-e Sar Tol (also Romanized as ‘Alīābād-e Sar Tol; also known as ‘Aliābād and ‘Alīābād-e Sartolī) is a village in Kushk-e Hezar Rural District, Beyza District, Sepidan County, Fars Province, Iran. At the 2006 census, its population was 949, in 233 families.

References 

Populated places in Beyza County